County collecting is keeping track of the counties and other major census divisions one has visited in the United States. Many county collectors try to go for blackout, to visit every county unit in the United States.  Others try to black out individual states, and others are only interested in keeping track of the counties they have visited without blacking out any states.

County collecting is a way for people to relate to geography and their own life histories.  One journalist characterized it as "a very organized form of wanderlust."  Many county collectors became interested in the pursuit after being given a school assignment to plot their travels on a county-outline map of the United States.  Many county collectors document their travels by being photographed with a county sign marker, or by taking a photo of the sign itself.  Some document these travels with gas and other receipts.  However, the web sites and organized groups that facilitate county collecting do not require a participant to prove his or her entry into a particular county.

The Extra Miler Club (EMC) was founded in 1973 by three county completionists who came up with the idea because they had been collecting license plates and noticed in their discussion how many rural counties they had all visited in that pursuit.  The club is a non-profit organization that meets annually in conjunction with the Automobile License Plate Collectors Association and recognizes completers (of which there are now 66, as of 2022) on its web site.  The club publishes a quarterly print newsletter.

As of August 2022, the county collecting web site mob-rule.com has 7725 registered users from all 50 states, 9 provinces of Canada, and 26 other foreign countries. The average number of visited counties is 585.

Some avid county collectors visit new counties by taking circuitous routes, for example, driving from Minneapolis to Chicago by way of Green Bay, Wisconsin.  The most determined collectors take entire trips which consist of driving around states in cornrow patterns.  This is pure county collecting.  On the other hand, taking a short detour from a direct route to visit one or more counties is called dipping.

There are currently 3,143 counties and county-equivalents in the United States, including the boroughs and census areas of Alaska, the parishes of Louisiana, the independent cities of Baltimore, Maryland, St. Louis, Missouri, Carson City, Nevada, 38 cities in Virginia and Washington, D.C. There are also counties and county equivalents in the provinces of Canada from Ontario to Nova Scotia. Mathematician William J. Cook used the principles of the travelling salesman problem to calculate that the optimal route visiting every county's seat in the mainland United States would cover , though he noted that county collectors typically travel a much longer distance.

Ken Jennings discussed the phenomenon and the Extra Miler Club in his 2012 book, Maphead: Charting the Wide, Weird World of Geography Wonks'.

In the news
In 1991, Allen Zondlak of Michigan completed a 36-year quest to visit every county, finishing on Nantucket stating he wanted to save the best for last.
In 2012, J. Stephen Conn of Tennessee finished a 17-year journey to visit every US county, covered in the Knoxville News Sentinel and the Chattanooga Times Free Press.
In 2015, a couple from Hancock, Michigan, Jennifer and Jonathan Riehl, had visited every county in the Lower 48 with the same vehicle, a Dodge Intrepid; the story was covered nationally by NBC News. The couple finished the Lower 48 on Nantucket, and had plans to take their car to Hawaii to finish the country.
In 2017, Hugh Steinhice of Tennessee, in conjunction with that year's total eclipse of the sun, recounted his story of visiting every US county, covered in the Chattanooga Times Free Press.
In 2019, Hugh Donovan of New Hampshire visited every US county in eight months, covered in the Cincinnati Enquirer'' and WMUR-TV in Manchester, New Hampshire.

References

External links
A county collector site that allows users to generate interactive maps
Extra Miler Club
County outline maps from the Census Bureau
Seeing America One County At A Time Blog
County Counting Blog
National Association of Counties

Collecting
Outdoor locating games